This article is about the particular significance of the year 1838 to Wales and its people.

Incumbents
Lord Lieutenant of Anglesey – Henry Paget, 1st Marquess of Anglesey 
Lord Lieutenant of Brecknockshire – Penry Williams
Lord Lieutenant of Caernarvonshire – Peter Drummond-Burrell, 22nd Baron Willoughby de Eresby 
Lord Lieutenant of Cardiganshire – William Edward Powell
Lord Lieutenant of Carmarthenshire – George Rice, 3rd Baron Dynevor 
Lord Lieutenant of Denbighshire – Sir Watkin Williams-Wynn, 5th Baronet    
Lord Lieutenant of Flintshire – Robert Grosvenor, 1st Marquess of Westminster 
Lord Lieutenant of Glamorgan – John Crichton-Stuart, 2nd Marquess of Bute 
Lord Lieutenant of Merionethshire – Sir Watkin Williams-Wynn, 5th Baronet
Lord Lieutenant of Monmouthshire – Capel Hanbury Leigh
Lord Lieutenant of Montgomeryshire – Edward Herbert, 2nd Earl of Powis
Lord Lieutenant of Pembrokeshire – Sir John Owen, 1st Baronet
Lord Lieutenant of Radnorshire – George Rodney, 3rd Baron Rodney

Bishop of Bangor – Christopher Bethell 
Bishop of Llandaff – Edward Copleston 
Bishop of St Asaph – William Carey 
Bishop of St Davids – John Jenkinson

Events
October - John Frost joins the Chartist movement.
Newly created baronets include Sir John Josiah Guest, Sir Benjamin Hall and Sir John Edwards.
John Cory of Devon opens his chandlery near the Custom House in Cardiff.
Thomas Gee joins his father's printing business.
Tinplate manufacture at Ystalyfera begins.
Wrexham Infirmary established.
Foundation of the Bangor Church Building Society.

Arts and literature
A major eisteddfod is held at Abergavenny.

New books
Sir Henry Ellis (ed.) - Registrum vulgariter nuncupatum "The record of Caernarvon"
Lady Charlotte Guest begins publication of her translation into English of the Mabinogion.
Isaac Williams - Thoughts in Past Years
Jane Williams (Ysgafell) - Twenty Essays on the Practical Improvement of God's Providential Dispensations as Means to the Moral Discipline to the Christian

Visual arts
J. M. W. Turner paints a watercolour of Flint Castle.

Births
14 April - John Thomas, photographer (d. 1905)
8 December - Charles Gresford Edmondes, clergyman and teacher (d. 1893)
27 December - James Conway Brown, musician (d. 1908)

Deaths
23 January - Pascoe Grenfell, industrialist and politician, 76
14 March - Wyndham Lewis, MP, 57
19 July - Christmas Evans, preacher, 71
26 August - Sir John Nicholl, politician and judge, 79
18 September - Griffith Williams (Gutyn Peris), poet, 69
26 December - Julia Ann Hatton, novelist, 74

References

 
Wales